HMS Valorous has been the name of four ships of the Royal Navy:

  was a Combatant-class sixth-rate sloop. She was launched at Hull in 1804, became an army depot ship in 1810, and was sold in 1817.
  was a  sixth-rate sloop, launched at Pembroke Dockyard in Wales in 1816. She was broken up at Chatham in 1829.
  was a 16-gun Magicienne-class paddle-frigate. She was launched at Pembroke Dockyard in 1851 and broken up in 1891. She was commanded in 1878 by Captain John A. Fisher (later Admiral of the Fleet Lord Fisher).
  was an Admiralty V-class destroyer leader built by William Denny and Brothers and launched in 1917. She was sold for scrapping in 1947.

Footnotes

References
 
Lyon, D. & Winfield, R. The Sail & Steam Navy List, London (2004): Chatham Publishing. 
Mackay, Ruddock F. Fisher of Kilverstone. London (1973): Oxford University Press.

Royal Navy ship names